Wicked World may refer to:
 The Wicked World, a play by W. S. Gilbert
 Wicked World (2009 film), a 2009 film by Barry J. Gillis
 Wicked World Records, a UK record company
 "Wicked World" (Black Sabbath song)
 "Wicked World" (Cold song)
 "Wicked World" (Daniel Johnston song), a song by Daniel Johnston from Songs of Pain
 Descendants: Wicked World a 2015 animated TV series